= Adigondanahalli =

- village
- Location in Karnataka, India Adigondanahalli (India)
- Coordinates: 12.8120700°N 77.750390°E
- Country: India
- State: Karnataka
- District: Bengaluru
- Talukas: Anekal

Government
  - Body: Village Panchayat

Population (2010)
  - Total: 1,354

Languages
  - Official: Kannada
- Time zone: UTC+5:30 (IST)
- PIN: 560 099
- Telephone code: 080
- Vehicle registration: ka-51
- Nearest city: Bengaluru
- Civic agency: Village Panchayat

Adigondanahalli is a village in the southern state of Karnataka, India.

The nearest town near this village is Attibele at a distance of around 5 km. The village is known for famous Lord Shiva Temple which was built by Pandavas.

== Demographics ==
As of 2011 India census, Adigondanahalli had a population of 1,354. Males constitute 676 of the population and females 678. Kannada is the official and most widely spoken language in Adigondanahalli. Adigondanahalli has an average literacy rate of 68.32 percent, higher than the national average of 59.5 percent, with 73.96 percent of the males and 62.68 percent of females literate.
